In mathematics, a structure is a set endowed with some additional features on the set (e.g. an operation, relation, metric, or topology). Often, the additional features are attached or related to the set, so as to provide it with some additional meaning or significance.

A partial list of possible structures are measures, algebraic structures (groups, fields, etc.), topologies, metric structures (geometries), orders, events, equivalence relations, differential structures, and categories.

Sometimes, a set is endowed with more than one feature simultaneously, which allows mathematicians to study the interaction between the different structures more richly. For example, an ordering imposes a rigid form, shape, or topology on the set, and if a set has both a topology feature and a group feature, such that these two features are related in a certain way, then the structure becomes a topological group.

Mappings between sets which preserve structures (i.e., structures in the domain are mapped to equivalent structures in the codomain) are of special interest in many fields of mathematics. Examples are homomorphisms, which preserve algebraic structures; homeomorphisms, which preserve topological structures; and diffeomorphisms, which preserve differential structures.

History
In 1939, the French group with the pseudonym Nicolas Bourbaki saw structures as the root of mathematics. They first mentioned them in their "Fascicule" of Theory of Sets and expanded it into Chapter IV of the 1957 edition. They identified three mother structures: algebraic, topological, and order.

Example: the real numbers
The set of real numbers has several standard structures:
An order: each number is either less or more than any other number.
Algebraic structure: there are operations of multiplication and addition that make it into a field.
A measure: intervals of the real line have a specific length, which can be extended to the Lebesgue measure on many of its subsets.
A metric: there is a notion of distance between points.
A geometry: it is equipped with a metric and is flat.
A topology: there is a notion of open sets.
There are interfaces among these:
Its order and, independently, its metric structure induce its topology.
Its order and algebraic structure make it into an ordered field.
Its algebraic structure and topology make it into a Lie group, a type of topological group.

See also 
Abstract structure
Isomorphism
Equivalent definitions of mathematical structures
Intuitionistic type theory
Space (mathematics)

References

Further reading

External links
  (provides a model theoretic definition.)
 Mathematical structures in computer science (journal)

 
Type theory
Set theory